The Fallen Ones is a Sci Fi Channel original movie from 2005.

Plot
Five thousand years ago, in Sumer, the fallen angels had intercourse with human females and their offspring were a race of giants called Nephilim, destroyed by the great flood. The evil angel Ammon (Navid Negahban) mummifies his son Aramis to save him and hides in hell. In the present day, the archaeologist Matt Fletcher (Casper Van Dien) finds Aramis tomb while excavating for building a resort for the entrepreneur Morton (Robert Wagner). The engineer Angela (Kristen Miller) joins the team, giving support in the diggings. When some workers mysteriously vanish, Morton hires the security force of Ammon to find the missing men. However, his real intention is to resurrect Aramis in the eclipse of the moon and dominate the human race with a new breed of giants. In the end, by creating a flood, they are able to drown both Aramis and Ammon, but not before Ammon reveals he has other children scattered at the four corners of the globe.

Cast
 Casper Van Dien as Matt Fletcher
 Kristen Miller as Angela
 Geoffrey Lewis as Gus
 Navid Negahban as Ammon
 Scott Whyte as Mickey
 Tom Bosley as Rabbi Eli Schmitt
 Robert Wagner as Morton
 Saginaw Grant as Joseph
 Irwin Keyes as Pale-Eye Priest
 Carel Struycken as High Priest #1
 Braeden Marcott as High Priest #2
 Robert Allen Mukes as Aramis
 Cameron VanHook as Giant Mummy
 Sahra Silanee as Lot's Daughter #1
 Regina K. Jones as Paltith, Lot's Daughter #2
 Katie L'Heureaux as Servant Girl #1
 Avena Lee as Servant Girl #2
 Nautica Thorn as Servant Girl #3
 Pablo Espinosa as Dennis, The Security Guard
 Shane P. Allen as Deputy #1
 Karen Bailey as Deputy #2
 Jodi Taffel as Construction Chick
 Melissa Jones Harper as Female Student
 Jeff Coatney as The Narrator 
 Osiris The Cat as Angela's Cat
 Michelle Rae Cannon as Sacrifice Servant (uncredited)
 Randal Reeder as Leader of Soldiers (uncredited)

References

External links

 Official site at SciFi.com

Syfy original films
2005 television films
2000s science fiction horror films
2005 horror films
2005 films
American science fiction horror films
American horror television films
2000s English-language films
2000s American films